Guillermo Cuadra Fernández (born 25 April 1984) is a Spanish football referee who officiates in La Liga. He has been a FIFA referee since 2020, and is ranked as a UEFA second category referee.

Refereeing career
Cuadra Fernández began officiating in the Segunda División B in 2013, the Segunda División in 2015 and La Liga in 2018. His first La Liga match as referee was on 17 August 2018 between Girona and Valladolid. In 2020, he was put on the FIFA referees list. He officiated his first UEFA club competition match on 17 September 2020, a meeting between Swedish club IFK Göteborg and Danish club Copenhagen in the 2020–21 UEFA Europa League second qualifying round.

In 2021, Cuadra Fernández was selected as a referee for the 2021 UEFA European Under-21 Championship in Hungary and Slovenia, replacing fellow countryman Ricardo de Burgos Bengoetxea, who tested positive for COVID-19. On 23 April 2021, he was selected by FIFA as a video assistant referee for the football tournaments at the 2020 Summer Olympics in Japan.

Personal life
Cuadra Fernández is a native of Madrid, and also worked as a teacher of English and physical education.

References

External links
 

1984 births
Living people
Sportspeople from Madrid
Spanish football referees